Upendra Limaye (born 8 November 1969) is an Indian actor, who won the National Film Award for his role in the Marathi film Jogwa.
On the centenary of Indian cinema in April 2013, Forbes included Limaye's performance in the film Jogwa on its list, "25 Greatest Acting Performances of Indian Cinema."

Biography 
He has acted in numerous experimental plays, Marathi parallel films, television serials, Hindi mainstream movies and a few South Indian films. He has worked with renowned stage and film directors like Madhur Bhandarkar, Ram Gopal Verma, Amol Palekar, Rajiv Patil, Jabbar Patel, Satish Alekar, Vinay Apte, Waman Kendre, Chandrakant Kulkarni, Anant Mahadevan, Karupaniannan and others.

His performance in the film Jogva, earned him the Best Male Actor award at the 56th National Films Awards in 2010, making him the first Marathi actor to be honoured with. Besides ‘Jogwa’, he has appeared in several National award-winning films, like ‘Mukta,’ ‘Bangarwadi,’ ‘Sarkarnama,’ ‘Dhyasparva’, ‘Chandni Bar,’ ‘Page 3,’ ‘Traffic Signal,’ to mention a few.

Upendra Limaye is married to Swati and they have two children.

Family background 
Upendra Limaye was born and grew up in Pune’s Sadashiv Peth.

Education 
Upendra Limaye studied in New English High School and Bharti Vidyapeeth, Pune.

In 1988, along with his friends za Upendra founded an Experimental Theatre platform called ‘Parichay’. In the next decade, Upendra acted in numerous experimental and commercial plays.

Filmography

Films

Television shows

Awards

Best Actor
Natya Gaurav Award
Year : 1996
Play Jallai Tuzi Preet

Best Actor
Kalnirnaya Award
Year : 1996
Play Jallai Tuzi Preet

Best Actor
Maharashtra Times Award
Year : 2005
Film Page 3

Best Actor
Hamlog Award
Year : 2005
Film Page3

Best Actor
Rashtriya Ratna Award
Year : 2006
Film Page 3

Best Actor
Kalarang Award
Year : 2009
Film Sarkar Raj / Urus

 Year: 2009 National Film Award for Best Actor for the film Jogwa
Best Actor
Shivaji Ganeshan Award
Year : 2009
Film Jogwa

Best Actor
V. Shantaram Award
Year : 2009
Film Jogwa

Best Actor
Baburao Painter Award
Year : 2009
Film Jogwa

Best Actor
Sanskriti Kaladarpan Award
Year : 2009
Film Jogwa

Best Actor
Maharashtra Times Award
Year : 2009
Film Jogwa

For Outstanding
Contribution to his Profession
Maharashtra Ratna Puraskar
Year : 2010

For Outstanding
Contribution to his Profession
Ninad Puraskar
Year : 2010

References

External links

 
 
 

1974 births
Living people
Indian male film actors
Male actors in Marathi cinema
Male actors in Hindi cinema
Male actors from Pune
Best Actor National Film Award winners
Marathi actors
20th-century Indian male actors
21st-century Indian male actors